Birimirtsi is a neighbourhood in Sofia, Bulgaria.

References

Neighbourhoods of Sofia